Judge Jackson (1883–1958) was an American sacred harp composer, songwriter, and educator. Judge Jackson may also refer to:

Amy Berman Jackson (born 1954), judge of the U.S. District Court for the District of Columbia
Brian A. Jackson (born 1960), judge of the United States District Court for the Middle District of Louisiana
Carol E. Jackson (born 1952), judge of the United States District Court for the Eastern District of Missouri
Charles Jackson (judge) (1775–1855), American jurist in Massachusetts
Helen J. Frye or Helen Jackson (1930–2011), American judge in Oregon
Howell Edmunds Jackson (1832–1895), judge of the United States Court of Appeals for the Sixth Circuit, later appointed to the U.S. Supreme Court
James M. Jackson (1825–1901), American lawyer and Democratic politician from West Virginia
John G. Jackson (politician) (1777–1825), judge of the United States District Court for the Western District of Virginia
John Jay Jackson Jr. (1824–1907), American lawyer, Whig politician, U.S. District Judge (initially for Virginia, later for the District of West Virginia)
Joseph Raymond Jackson (1880–1969), judge of the United States Court of Customs and Patent Appeals
Ketanji Brown Jackson (born 1970), judge on the U.S. Court of Appeals for the District of Columbia Circuit, later appointed to the U.S. Supreme Court
Lawrence Jackson (judge) (1914–1993), chief justice of the Supreme Court of Western Australia
Peter Jackson (judge) (born 1955), English Appeal Court judge
R. Brooke Jackson (born 1947), judge of the U.S. District Court for the District of Colorado
Raymond Alvin Jackson (born 1949), judge of the United States District Court for the Eastern District of Virginia
Rupert Jackson (born 1948), justice of the Court of Appeal of England and Wales
Thomas Penfield Jackson (1937–2013), judge of the U.S. District Court for the District of Columbia

See also
Candace Jackson-Akiwumi (born 1979), judge of the U.S. Court of Appeals for the Seventh Circuit
Justice Jackson (disambiguation)